Björn Erik Alm (born 23 December 1961) is a Swedish sailor from Borlänge who represented his country at the 1992 Summer Olympics in Barcelona, Spain as crew member in the Soling. With helmsman Magnus Holmberg and fellow crew member Johan Barne they took the 5th place. Björn with helmsman Magnus Holmberg and fellow crew member Johan Barne took 13th place during the 1996 Summer Olympics in Savannah, Georgia, United States in the Soling.

References

External links
 

1961 births
Living people
Swedish male sailors (sport)
Olympic sailors of Sweden
Sailors at the 1992 Summer Olympics – Soling
Sailors at the 1996 Summer Olympics – Soling
People from Borlänge Municipality
Sportspeople from Dalarna County